Joseph Frantz may refer to:

 Joe Frantz (born 1976), cinematographer for the CKY video series
 Joseph Frantz (soldier) (1837–1913), Union Army soldier and Medal of Honor recipient